Wolgot is a dong, neighbourhood of Siheung in Gyeonggi Province southwest of Seoul and south of Incheon, bordering on Soraepogu. There is also a fishing harbor on the local ocean inlet, near which numerous high-rise apartment buildings are located. Several small hotels and seafood restaurants also serve visitors. In June 2012 a new subway station was opened on the Suin Line, a new subway line currently open between Seoul Subway Line 4 and the Incheon Subway Line 1 of the Seoul Metropolitan Subway system. Many buses also stop in Wolgot. On March 1, 2014, it was separated from Gunpo-dong.

School 

 Wolgot Middle School
 Wolpo Elementary School
 Wolgot Elementary School

Neighbourhoods in South Korea
Siheung